Empire is the second album by British rock band Kasabian, released in August 2006. The album went on to No. 1 in the UK Albums Chart upon its release and was preceded by the release of new single "Empire" on 24 July 2006.

According to Tom Meighan in an interview on the album with the NME in early 2006, "Empire" is a word used by the band to describe something that is good. As of 3 May 2017 the album has sold over 800,000 copies in the band's home country of the UK.

Empire was the first full Kasabian album to feature drummer Ian Matthews, who was recruited in 2005. Lead songwriter and guitarist Christopher Karloff left the band in early 2006, during recording of the album, having contributed the music for three tracks.

Critical reception

Empire received mixed-to-positive reviews. Music critics were divided by the band's choices in production and lyricism, despite many considering them better than their self-titled debut. At Metacritic, which assigns a normalised rating out of 100 to reviews from mainstream critics, the album received an average score of 65, based on 20 reviews.

Dan Martin of NME found the album better than their self-titled debut, praising the band for mixing all their influences into tracks that can be called their own, saying that: "Through sheer, bloody-minded relief, weapons-graded stamina and a big, big imagination, Kasabian have willed themselves into brilliance." Jason MacNeil of PopMatters found some production choices on the tracks off-putting but said that Empire shows the band's potential of crafting better projects in their given ilk, concluding that: "On the whole, it’s a good second step, but hopefully step three is more in line with the shock and awe the first album contained." Chris Salmon of The Guardian noted that Kasabian's boastful talk of the album resulted in a mixed bag of tracks that fall just shy of their claim, in terms of influenced production and lyricism, saying that: "While Empire isn't an exceptional record, it offers enough to be described as a good one."

AllMusic's David Jeffries commended the band for taking a grand-scale approach to mixing their influences into an Oasis-sized project, but felt they forgot to write catchy tracks to lead the album, saying that: "Lost in all this is the instantly grabbing songwriting of Kasabian's debut, and to some extent, the bandmembers themselves, who often seem to be riding this swirl instead of guiding it." Despite praising a few tracks, Lauren Murphy of Entertainment.ie felt the album was just a retread of their debut with Tom Meighan's vocals starting to sound strained throughout, concluding with: "If Kasabian hadn't attempted to build their Empire by recounting its wonderment prematurely, it might have stood a chance; instead, their audacity just proves them to be, unsurprisingly, more geezer, less Caesar." Peter Relic of Rolling Stone criticized the album for sounding like a rehash of established British rock bands and Meighan for having weak vocal delivery on the tracks, calling it "miles worse than their shallow but tasty first, its big-budget production only making its shortcomings more apparent."

Track listing

Personnel
Adapted from the Empire liner notes.

Kasabian
Tom Meighan – lead vocals , backing vocals 
Sergio Pizzorno – guitars, synthesizers, backing vocals, lead vocals 
Chris Edwards – bass, Wurlitzer piano 
Ian Matthews – drums, percussion

Additional musicians
 Joana Glaza – backing vocals 
 Farhat Bouallagui – violin and viola 
 Bouzid Ezzedine – violin 
 Jazzer Haj Youssef – violin 
 James Banbury – cello 
 Jo Archard – violin 
 Fiona McCapra – violin 
 Vince Greene – viola 
 Nick Attwood – trombone 
 Craig Crofton – saxophone 
 Gary Alesbrook – trumpet 

Technical personnel
 Jim Abbiss, Kasabian – production
 Barny – recording, mixing 
 "Beatle Ben" – recording assistant
 Owen Skinner – mixing assistant 
 Andy Wallace – mixing 
 Jean-Loup Morette – strings engineering 
 George Marino – mastering
 Julie Verhoeven – illustrations
 Andy Hayes – design and layout

Charts and certifications

Weekly charts

Year-end charts

Certifications

References

External links
Official website
BMG site – Kasabian (Japan)
BMG site – Empire (Australia)

2006 albums
Albums produced by Jim Abbiss
Kasabian albums
RCA Records albums